Carlo Stefano Rodríguez Lara (born 24 September 1988) is a Mexican football forward.

He have previously played for Estudiantes Tecos in the Primera Division de Mexico and FC Banants and Ulisses FC in the Armenian Premier League.

Career

Santa Lucía
In mid-August 2019, Rodríguez joined Santa Lucía Cotzumalguapa FC in Guatemala. Two months later, on 10 October 2019, it was announced that he had left the club by mutual agreement, after having failed to live up to the expectations, playing 303 minutes in the league without scoring.

References

External links

1988 births
Living people
Tecos F.C. footballers
Association football forwards
Mexico international footballers
Footballers from Guadalajara, Jalisco
Mexican footballers
Mexican expatriate footballers
Liga MX players
Ascenso MX players
Armenian Premier League players
Leones Negros UdeG footballers
Murciélagos FC footballers
FC Urartu players
Ulisses FC players
Irapuato F.C. footballers
Cafetaleros de Chiapas footballers
Loros UdeC footballers
Club Atlético Zacatepec players
Tampico Madero F.C. footballers
Mexican expatriate sportspeople in Armenia
Mexican expatriate sportspeople in Guatemala
Expatriate footballers in Armenia
Expatriate footballers in Guatemala